This is a list of United States national Golden Gloves champions in the light welterweight division, along with the state or region they represented.

1966 - Larry Draut - Santa Rosa, CA
1967 - Willie Richardson - Detroit, MI
1968 - Harold Beal - Kansas City, MO
1969 - Eddie Beauford - Indianapolis, IN
1970 - Larry Bonds - Denver, CO
1971 - Wiley Johnson - Cincinnati, OH
1972 - Sugar Ray Seales - Tacoma, WA
1973 - Larry Bonds - Denver, CO
1974 - Sugar Ray Leonard - Palmer Park, MD
1975 - Paul Sherry - Las Vegas, NV
1976 - Ronnie Shields - Fort Worth, TX
1977 - Thomas Hearns - Detroit, MI
1978 - Ronnie Shields - Fort Worth, TX
1979 - Lemuel Steeples - St. Louis, MO
1980 - Terry Silver - Louisville, KY
1981 - Henry Hughes - Cleveland, OH
1982 - Tim Rabon - Lafayette, LA
1983 - Roderick Moore - Detroit, MI
1984 - Tim Rabon - Lafayette, LA
1985 - Robert Guy - Fort Worth, TX
1986 - Roy Jones Jr. - Pensacola, FL
1987 - Todd Foster - Great Falls, MT
1988 - Skipper Kelp - Born in Saigon, Vietnam he fought from Las Vegas, NV
1989 - Victor McKinnia - Denver, CO
1990 - Mark Lewis - Los Angeles, CA
1991 - Terron Millett - St. Louis, MO
1992 - Robert Frazier - Syracuse, NY
1993 - David Diaz - Chicago, IL
1994 - David Diaz - Chicago, IL
1995 - Demarcus Corley - Washington, DC
1996 - David Diaz - Chicago, IL
1997 - Adan Reyes - Los Angeles, CA
1998 - Ricardo Williams - Jr., Cincinnati, OH
1999 - Alejandre F Johnson - Philadelphia, PA
2000 - Jessie Byers - Knoxville, TN
2001 - Chad Aquino - Kansas City, MO
2002 - Larry Gonzáles - Denver, CO
2003 - Lorenzo Reynolds - Saginaw, MI
2004 - Jeremy Bryan - Paterson, NJ
2005 - Jeremy Bryan - Paterson, NJ
2006 - Brad Solomon - Lafayette, LA
2007 - Kaila Browe - Lafayette, LA
2008 - Danny O'Connor - Framingham, MA
2009 - Jose Benavidez - at only 16 years old, he was the youngest light welterweight champions.
2010 - Gary Allen Russell III
2011 - Michael Reed - Washington DC
2012 - George Rincon - Carollton, Texas
2013 - Julian Rodriguez - New Jersey
2014 - Gary Antuanne Russell - Maryland
2015 - Jaron Ennis - Pennsylvania
2016 - Frank Martin - Indianapolis
2017 - Aadam Ali - New Jersey

References

Golden Gloves